Tres Arroyos Airport  is an airport serving Tres Arroyos, a city in the Buenos Aires Province of Argentina. The airport is just west of the city.

See also

Transport in Argentina
List of airports in Argentina

References

External links
OpenStreetMap - Tres Arroyos Airport
OurAirports - Tres Arroyos Airport

Airports in Argentina